Nightcap: The Unreleased Masters 1973–1991 (1993) is a double compilation album by Jethro Tull released on 22 November 1993. It contains much of the band's previously unreleased material.

The first disc contains material recorded in August 1972, much of which was re-recorded and re-arranged for the band's sixth album, A Passion Play (the lyrics of "Critique Oblique" and "Scenario" actually refer to the "passion play" in question). The songs "Scenario", "Audition" and "No Rehearsal" initially appeared on the 20 Years of Jethro Tull box set as a single track entitled "The Chateau d'Isaster Tapes". This humorous title is also used on Nightcap as the title of the entire first disc. The material on the first disc was mixed and arranged as the aforementioned three tracks were on the 20 Years box set with numerous flute overdubs by Ian Anderson, but excludes the songs "Big Top" and "Sailor". All "Chateau d'Isaster" material was included as part of the 2014 re-release of A Passion Play, without any overdubs.

The second disc contains unreleased material recorded between 1974 and 1991, in particular extra songs from the sessions for The Broadsword and the Beast. Most, but not all, of these songs also appear as bonus tracks on remastered versions of Jethro Tull's 1970's albums.

The album was produced in limited quantities with proceeds going to charity.

Track listing

Disc one
My Round: Chateau d'Isaster Tapes
 "First Post" – 1:54
 "Animelée" – 1:41
 "Tiger Toon" – 1:36
 "Look at the Animals" – 5:09
 "Law of the Bungle" – 2:32
 "Law of the Bungle Part II" – 5:26
 "Left Right" – 5:01
 "Solitaire" – 1:25
 "Critique Oblique" – 9:03
 "Post Last" – 5:35
 "Scenario" – 3:26
 "Audition" – 2:34
 "No Rehearsal" – 5:12

Disc two
Your Round: Unreleased and Rare Tracks
 "Paradise Steakhouse"  (recorded 1974) – 4:01
 "Sealion II"  (recorded 1974) – 3:21
 "Piece of Cake"  (recorded 1990) – 3:40
 "Quartet"  (recorded 1974) – 2:45
 "Silver River Turning"  (recorded 1990) – 4:52
 "Crew Nights"  (recorded 1981) – 4:33
 "The Curse"  (recorded 1981) – 3:39
 "Rosa on the Factory Floor"  (recorded 1990) – 4:38
 "A Small Cigar"  (recorded 1975) – 3:39
 "Man of Principle"   (recorded 1988) – 3:57
 "Commons Brawl"  (recorded 1981) – 3:24
 "No Step"  (recorded 1981) – 3:38
 "Drive on the Young Side of Life"  (recorded 1981) – 4:13
 "I Don't Want to Be Me"  (recorded 1990) – 3:29
 "Broadford Bazaar"  (recorded 1978) – 3:38
 "Lights Out"  (recorded 1981) – 5:16
 "Truck Stop Runner"  (recorded 1991) – 3:47
 "Hard Liner"  (recorded 1989) – 3:47

Recording locations and information
Disc 1:
 All tracks recorded August 1972 at Château d'Hérouville, Hérouville, France.
Ian Anderson - vocals, flute, acoustic guitar, mandolin, tin whistle, fife
Martin Barre - electric guitar, spoken word
Jeffrey Hammond-Hammond - backing vocals, bass guitar
John Evan - piano, synthesizer, Hammond organ, celeste
Barriemore Barlow - drums, percussion
Disc 2:
 Ian Anderson - vocals, flute, acoustic guitar, mandolin, tin whistle, fife, keyboards (on "No Step", "Lights Out, Hard Liner")
 Tracks 1, 2 and 4 recorded 1974 at Morgan Studios, Fulham London
Martin Barre - electric guitar
Barriemore Barlow - drums, percussion
John Evan - Hammond organ, synthesizer, piano, accordion (on "Quartet")
Jeffrey Hammond-Hammond - acoustic string bass (on "Quartet"), vocals on ("Sealion II")
Dee Palmer - keyboards, orchestra conductor (on track 4)
 Track 9 recorded 1975 at Maison Rouge Mobile Studio
Dee Palmer - keyboards, orchestra conductor
 Track 15 recorded 1978 at Maison Rouge Mobile Studio, Fulham, London
 Tracks 6, 7, 11 – 13 and 16 recorded 1981 at Maison Rouge Studios, Fulham, London
Martin Barre - electric guitar
Dave Pegg - backing vocals, bass guitar, mandolin
Gerry Conway - drums, percussion
Peter-John Vettese - piano, synthesizer (on tracks 6 and 13)
 Track 10 recorded 1988 at Ian Anderson's home studio
Martin Barre - electric guitar
Dave Pegg - backing vocals, bass guitar
Gerry Conway - drums, percussion
 Track 18 recorded 1989 at Ian Anderson's home studio
Martin Barre - electric guitar
Dave Pegg - backing vocals, bass guitar
 Tracks 3, 5, 8 and 14 recorded 1990 at Ian Anderson's home studio
Martin Barre - electric guitar
Dave Pegg - bass guitar
Doane Perry - drums, percussion
John Bundrick - piano, Hammond organ (on tracks 3, 5 and 8)
 Track 17 recorded 1991 at Ian Anderson's home studio and Woodworm Studios.
Martin Barre - electric guitar
Matthew Pegg - bass guitar
Scott Hunter - drums, percussion (Doane Perry is mistakenly credited on this track in the CD booklet?)

References

Jethro Tull (band) compilation albums
1993 compilation albums
Chrysalis Records compilation albums
Albums produced by Ian Anderson